Monochroa parvulata is a moth of the family Gelechiidae. It is found from southern and central Europe to Estonia in the north and the southern Ural in the east.

References

Moths described in 1957
Monochroa
Moths of Europe